The 2006–07 VCU Rams men's basketball team represented Virginia Commonwealth University during the 2006–07 NCAA Division I men's basketball season. The Rams played in the Colonial Athletic Association.

Schedule 

|-
!colspan=12 style="background:#000000; color:#FFFFFF; border:2px solid #FFBA00;"| Non-conference regular season
|-

|-
!colspan=12 style="background:#000000; color:#FFFFFF; border:2px solid #FFBA00;"| CAA regular season
|-

|-
!colspan=12 style="background:#000000; color:#FFFFFF; border:2px solid #FFBA00;"| CAA tournament
|-

|-
!colspan=12 style="background:#000000; color:#FFFFFF; border:2px solid #FFBA00;"| NCAA tournament
|-

|-

References 

VCU
VCU Rams men's basketball seasons
VCU
VCU Rams
VCU Rams